Matthew Barrett may refer to:

 Matthew Barrett (banker) (born 1944), Irish Canadian banker
 Matthew Barrett (journalist) (born 1992), British journalist
 Matt Barrett (born 1970), American politician of Ohio
 Matthew Barrett, Australian rapper, known as Matty B
 Matthew Barrett, American law professor at Notre Dame Law School and casebook editor
 Matthew David Barrett (born 1974), Australian botanist